Robert Dennis Fulk (born October 2, 1951) is an American philologist and medievalist who is Professor Emeritus of English and Germanic Studies at Indiana University Bloomington.

Biography
Robert Dennis Fulk was born in Chicago on October 2, 1951. He received a BA in English from Oakland University in 1973, a MA in English from the University of Chicago in 1974, an MFA in Fiction from the University of Iowa in 1976, and a PhD in English from the University of Iowa in 1982. From 1982 to 1983, Fulk was Visiting Assistant Professor of English at Wabash College. At Indiana University Bloomington, Fulk served as Assistant Professor of English from 1983-1987, and as Associate Professor of English from 1987 to 1992. From 1987 to 1988, Fulk was Visiting Associate Professor of English at the University of Copenhagen. He became a tenured professor at Indiana University Bloomington in 1990. At Indiana University Bloomington, Fulk has been Professor of English since 1992, and Adjunct Professor of Germanic Studies since 2005.

Fulk specializes in Germanic studies, Celtic studies and Indo-European studies, with a particular focus on language and literature. He is a known expert on Old English and Old Icelandic literature. Particular areas of research are Old and Middle English dialectology, phonological and morphological change, textual criticism, and early Germanic metrics.

A festschrift in honor of Fulk was edited by Leonard Neidorf, Rafael J. Pascual, and Tom Shippey. It was published in 2016 as Old English Philology: Studies in Honour of R. D. Fulk (Cambridge: D. S. Brewer).

Selected works

 Interpretations of Beowulf: A Critical Anthology, 1991 (contributions by Jane Chance, Stanley B. Greenfield, Francis P. Magoun, Tom Shippey, J. R. R. Tolkien and others)
 A History of Old English Meter, 1992
 A History of Old English Literature, 2008
 Klaeber's Beowulf and the Fight at Finnsburg, 2008
 The Beowulf Manuscript: Complete Texts and The Fight at Finnsburg, 2010
 A Grammar of Old English, Volume 2: Morphology, 2012
 An Introduction to Middle English: Grammar, Texts, 2012
 The Old English Canons of Theodore, 2012
 An Introductory Grammar of Old English, with an Anthology of Readings, Medieval and Renaissance Texts and Studies, 463/MRTS Texts for Teaching, 8 (Tempe, Arizona: Arizona Centre for Medieval and Renaissance Studies, 2014)
 Studies in the History of the English Language VI: Evidence and Method in Histories of English, 2015
 The Old English Pastoral Care, 2021

See also
 Geoffrey Russom

References

External links
 R. D. Fulk at the website of Indiana University Bloomington
 Website of R. D. Fulk

1951 births
Living people
American medievalists
American philologists
Anglo-Saxon studies scholars
Celtic studies scholars
Germanic studies scholars
Indiana University Bloomington faculty
Indo-Europeanists
Linguists of Germanic languages
Linguists of Indo-European languages
Oakland University alumni
Old Norse studies scholars
People from Chicago
University of Chicago alumni
Academic staff of the University of Copenhagen
University of Iowa alumni
Wabash College faculty
Historians from Illinois